Cricket in Afghanistan is the most popular sport in the country, which is represented internationally by the Afghanistan national cricket team. Afghanistan became a full member of the International Cricket Council on 22 June 2017, entitling the national team to participate in official Test matches. Afghanistan has produced a few prominent cricketers over the years, who later went on to become widely popular in world cricket including Rashid Khan, Mohammad Nabi and Mujeeb Ur Rahman.

In August 2021, concerns and doubts were raised over the participation of Afghanistan cricket team in future international matches ever since Afghanistan was brought under the control of the Taliban. Concerns were raised over the safety of Afghan national cricketers and their families who were still in Afghanistan during the Taliban takeover on 15 August 2021. Uncertainties also developed regarding the future of cricket in Afghanistan and reports emerged that Taliban would be expected to dismantle the Afghanistan women's national cricket team due to the Taliban's opposition towards women's rights.

However, Taliban revealed that it would not disrupt the men's cricket team's participation in international matches and allowed Afghanistan to play their first ever bilateral series against Pakistan in Sri Lanka which scheduled to start in September 2021. Taliban also ordered the Afghanistan Cricket Board to carry on the activities as usual although the Taliban fighters arrived at the ACB headquarters with guns.

Despite the political turmoil, Afghanistan cricket team's media manager Hikmat Hassan confirmed that Afghanistan would participate in the 2021 ICC Men's T20 World Cup.

History
Cricket was first played in Afghanistan during the 19th century Anglo-Afghan Wars, with British troops reported to have played in Kabul in 1839. However, unlike many countries, no lasting cricket legacy was left by the British, and it would be more than a hundred years before cricket returned.

Afghanistan's vicinity to Test playing nations of India and Pakistan has helped the game take root. In the 1990s, cricket became popular amongst Afghan refugees in Pakistan, and the Afghanistan Cricket Federation was formed there in 1995.  They continued to play cricket on their return to their home country in late 2001. Like all sports, cricket was originally banned by the Taliban, but it became an exception in 2000 and the Afghanistan Cricket Federation was elected as an affiliate member of the ICC the following year. Although Taliban had originally banned cricket during their regime, it was during the Taliban rule between 1996 and 2001 cricket had developed significantly in the country with many Afghan refugees in Peshawar picking up the sport.

The Afghanistan national cricket team's 21-run win over Namibia in Krugersdorp earned them official One Day International status in April 2009. The team qualified for the 2012 ICC Under-19 Cricket World Cup.

Today cricket is one of the most popular sports in Afghanistan, and the Afghanistan team has made quick progress in the international world of cricket.

Governing Body

Afghanistan Cricket Board (ACB) is the official governing body of the sport of cricket in Afghanistan. Its current headquarters is in Kabul, Afghanistan. The Afghanistan Cricket Board is Afghanistan's representative at the International Cricket Council and was an associate member of ICC from June 2013 to 2017. Now it is one of the full members of ICC since 2017. It is also a member of the Asian Cricket Council.

Domestic Competitions
Afghanistan's domestic structure originally consisted of a 25-over Inter-Provincial Tournament, which had the participation of 22 provinces in the tournament. The aim of the tournament was to spread the game across the country and to generate a greater depth of talent for the national team to select from. The best players from the tournament were selected players for Afghanistan A and under-19 teams based on their performance and would be sent for training and coaching to Bangladesh.The top two teams from the 12-team first round advanced to the next round. The top six from the tournament then contested a 50 over tournament in Kabul. The 50 over tournament in May 2010 was won by Kabul Province.

Starting in 2011, Afghanistan's domestic cricket structure has grown. The expanded Inter-Provincial Tournament was reorganized into a 50 over tournament and divided into a Challenge Cup section (the Etisalat ODN Challenge Cup with 20 provincial teams) and an Elite Cup section (with 12 provincial teams; 4 of them qualifiers from the Challenge Cup section). In addition to the Inter-Provincial cricket the Afghanistan Cricket Board (ACB) has divided the provinces of Afghanistan in to 5 Cricket Regions to enable the better management of the game. The Regions are Amo in the north (centered on Balkh), Spin Ghar in the east (centered on Nangarhar), Band-e-Amir in the centre (centered on Kabul), Mis Ainak in the southeast (centered on Khost) and Boost in the west and southwest (centered on Kandahar). The 5 regions in turn have representative teams which play in all traditional 3 formats of cricket.

Afghanistan's playing season runs from May to September. There are 320 cricket clubs and 6 turf wickets in Afghanistan. In February 2017 the International Cricket Council (ICC) awarded first-class status to Afghanistan's four-day domestic competition. They also granted List A status to their existing Twenty20 domestic competition, as Afghanistan did not have a domestic 50-over tournament. In May 2017 however, the ICC recognised the 50-over Ghazi Amanullah Khan Regional One Day Tournament by granting it List A status.

In addition to an expansion of the inter-provincial tournament from 25-over matches to 50-over matches and the addition of the T-20 and multi-day formats, cricket in Afghanistan has now expanded across the provinces as well; 32 of the 34 provinces now have representative sides. All provinces except Daykundi and Farah have a representative team, while the ACB recognizes Afghan Refugees and Koochian (Nomads) as provincial teams. The three-day league competition was expanded into a four-day league in 2014-15.

The UAE-based telecommunications company, Etisalat is now one of the main sponsors of Afghanistan's cricket, including being then title sponsor in Afghanistan's division 2 inter-provincinal challenge cup and the Etisalat Sixes T20 Tournament.

Starting from the 2017 season, Afghanistan has a four-day first-class competition (Ahmad Shah Abdali 4-day Tournament), a 50-over List A competition (Ghazi Amanullah Khan Regional One Day Tournament) and a recognized Twenty20 league (Shpageeza Cricket League). In 2019, an additional 3-day first-class event (Mirwais Nika Provincial 3-Day) and a List A event (Afghanistan Provincial Challenge Cup) were launched for individual provinces to compete in.

Regional domestic teams

 Region: Amo
Balkh Province
Faryab Province
Jowzjan Province
Samangan Province
Sar-e Pol Province
 Region: Band-e-Amir
Ghazni Province
Bamyan Province
Daykundi Province
Maidan Wardak Province
 Region: Boost
Kandahar Province
Helmand Province
Nimruz Province
Uruzgan Province
Zabul Province
 Region: Hindukush
Herat Province
Badghis Province
Farah Province
Ghor Province
 Region: Mis Ainak
Khost Province
Logar Province
Paktia Province
Paktika Province
 Region: Pamir
Kunduz Province
Badakhshan Province
Baghlan Province
Panjshir Province
Parwan Province
Takhar Province
 Region: Spin Ghar
Nangarhar Province
Kapisa Province
Kunar Province
Laghman Province
Nuristan Province
 Region: Kabul

Stadiums

The Afghan national cricket team does not play its home matches inside Afghanistan due to the ongoing security situation and the lack of international standard facilities. Afghanistan played their 'home' Intercontinental Cup fixture against Ireland at the Rangiri Dambulla International Stadium in Sri Lanka. Following Afghanistan's World Twenty20 qualifying campaign they played two One Day Internationals against Canada at the Sharjah Cricket Association Stadium in the UAE, after which the stadium was named the 'home' ground of Afghanistan.

Work on the Sherzai Cricket Stadium in Jalalabad, a city known in Afghanistan for being the 'capital of cricket', is in progress. Construction has also begun on the Kabul National Cricket Stadium and the Kandahar International Cricket Stadium in the south of the country. The President of the Afghanistan Cricket Board, Omar Zakhilwal, announced in October 2010 that the government was planning to construct standard cricket grounds in all 34 provinces in the next two years.

In 2016, Shahid Vijay Singh Pathik Sports Complex in Greater Noida became the home ground for the Afghanistan national cricket team after they decided to shift their home ground from Sharjah.

The following are the main cricket stadiums in Afghanistan:
 Ghazi Amanullah International Cricket Stadium in Ghazi Amanullah Town, Jalalabad
 Kandahar International Cricket Stadium in Kandahar
 Kabul National Cricket Stadium in Kabul
 Khost City Stadium in Khost
 Balkh Cricket Stadium in Mazar-i-Sharif
 Sherzai Cricket Stadium in Jalalabad (under construction)
 Kunduz Cricket Stadium in Kunduz

These grounds have hosted matches involving Afghanistan:
 Rangiri Dambulla International Stadium, Dambulla
 Sharjah Cricket Association Stadium, Sharjah
 Shahid Vijay Singh Pathik Sports Complex, Greater Noida
 Rajiv Gandhi International Cricket Stadium, Dehradun, Dehradun
Bharat Ratna Shri Atal Bihari Vajpayee Ekana Cricket Stadium

National team

The Afghanistan national cricket team represents the country of Afghanistan in international cricket matches. The national team was formed in 2001, immediately after took part in Pakistan domestic circuit after being invited in 2001 . which played in the 2009 World Cup Qualifier after rising rapidly through the World Cricket League, starting in Division Five in May 2008. They play in the Elite division of the ACC Trophy.

Afghanistan's 21-run win over Namibia in Krugersdorp earned them official One Day International status. Afghanistan won their first One Day International against Scotland. In 2011, the team qualified for the 2012 ICC Under-19 Cricket World Cup.

National Team Honours
Winners of the ACC Twenty20 Cup the most number of times (2007, 2009, 2011 and 2013).
Winners ICC World Twenty20 Qualifier 2010 and two Runners-up in 2012 and 2013.
Winners of the season 2009-2010 ICC Intercontinental Cup and Runners-up in 2011-2013 season.
Runners-up in the Asian Games 2010 and 2014.
Winners of the 2014 ACC Premier League.
Winners of the 2010 ACC Trophy (Elite)
Winners of the 2018 ICC World Cup Qualifier

Women's team

The Afghanistan national women's cricket team is the team that represents the country of Afghanistan in international women's cricket matches. The team was formed in 2010, drawing on players mostly from Kabul. Although the team is yet to play representative cricket, it had been scheduled to take part in the 2011 ACC Women’s Twenty20 in Kuwait, which ran from 17 – 25 February.  The team was forced to withdraw from the tournament before travelling to Kuwait due to elements in Afghanistan  opposing women's participation in sport

Under-19 Cricket Team

Afghanistan national under-19 cricket team represents the country of Afghanistan in U-19 international cricket.

Afghanistan finished second in the 2009 Under-19 Cricket World Cup Qualifier which was held in Canada. The team gained victories over the under-19 teams of Sierra Leone, Hong Kong, Vanuatu, the United States, Uganda, the Netherlands, Papua New Guinea. The team lost just two matches to Ireland and Canada. Afghanistan have finished fourth in 2011 Under-19 Cricket World Cup Qualifier which gained them qualification to 2012 Under-19 Cricket World Cup.

The team played in the 2010 Under-19 Cricket World Cup in New Zealand. Afghanistan were drawn in Group A, where they played against England, Hong Kong and India.

Afghanistan played in the 2012 Under-19 Cricket World Cup. They played against Pakistan, New Zealand and Scotland.

Afghanistan had qualified for 2014 Under-19 Cricket World Cup. They were drawn against Australia, Bangladesh and Namibia in group B where they beat and qualified for Super league where they lost to South Africa. They finished tournament well by securing 7th position.

In October 2014, Afghanistan under-19 team toured neighboring country Pakistan for a three One Day match series, which ended up in the favor of Afghanistan as 2-1.

See also
 Sport in Afghanistan
 Out of the Ashes (2010 film), a 2010 documentary film
 Afghanistan A tour of Pakistan in 2013

References

External links
Afgcric site
Afghanistan Cricket
Cricinfo-Afghanistan
Afghan pages on asiancricket.org